The Australian women's national youth handball team is the national under–17 Handball team of Australia. Controlled by the Australian Handball Federation it represents Australia in international matches.

History

Youth Olympic Games record

Oceania Nations Cup record

References

External links
Official website
 Profile on International Handball Federation webpage
 Oceania Continent Handball Federation webpage

Women's national youth handball teams
Youth national team
Handball - Youth women's